Live at Eddie's Attic is the first release from The Civil Wars, featuring Joy Williams and John Paul White. The album was recorded live at Eddie's Attic in Decatur, Georgia on April 8, 2009. It was released on their website through NoiseTrade as a free download on June 30, 2009. The album has been downloaded over 500,000 times to date. On April 19, 2014, the album was re-released in a limited edition vinyl pressing in celebration of Record Store Day.

Track listing

References

2009 debut albums
The Civil Wars live albums
2009 live albums